Gardens in England is a link page for any garden, botanical garden, arboretum or pinetum open to the public in England. The National Gardens Scheme also opens many small, interesting, private gardens to the public on one or two days a year for charity.

National
 List of sites on the National Register of Historic Parks and Gardens

Bedfordshire
 Whipsnade Tree Cathedral
 Wrest Park Gardens

Berkshire
 Caversham Court
 Deanery Garden
 Folly Farm, Sulhamstead
 Forbury Gardens
 Frogmore
 Harris Garden
 Welford Park

Buckinghamshire
 Ascott
 Cliveden
 The Manor House, Bledlow
 Stowe Landscape Garden
 Waddesdon
 West Wycombe Park

Cambridgeshire
 Anglesey Abbey
 Cambridge University Botanic Garden
 Christ's College, Cambridge

Cheshire
 Jodrell Bank Arboretum
 Ness Botanic Gardens
 Tatton Park - National Trust

Cornwall
Gardens in Cornwall:
 Antony House, Antony
 Caerhays
 Carclew
 Chyverton
 Cotehele
 Eden Project
 Glendurgan, Mawnan Smith
 Ince Castle
 Lamellen
 Lanhydrock House, Lanhydrock
 Longcross Victorian Gardens, near Port Isaac
 Lost Gardens of Heligan
 Mary Newman's Cottage, Saltash
 Morrab Gardens, Penzance
 Pencarrow, near Egloshyale
 Penjerrick Garden, Budock
 Pine Lodge
 Probus Gardens, Probus
 St Michael's Mount
 Trebah
 Trelissick Garden
 Tremeer, near St Tudy
 Trengwainton Garden, Madron
 Trerice, near Newlyn East
 Tresco Abbey Gardens, Isles of Scilly
 Trewithen, near Probus

Cumbria
 Holehird Gardens
 Holker Hall
 Levens Hall

Derbyshire
 Chatsworth
 Dunge Valley Hidden Garden

Devon
 Bicton Park
 Castle Drogo
 Coleton Fishacre
 Escot Park
 The Garden House, at Buckland Monachorum
 Holbrook Garden, near Tiverton
 Killerton
 Knightshayes
 Marwood Hill
 Plant World
 Rosemoor Garden - Royal Horticultural Society
 Tapeley Park Gardens
 Winsford Walled Garden

Dorset
 Abbotsbury Subtropical Gardens
 Bennetts Water Gardens
 Chiswell Walled Garden
 Compton Acres
 Easton Gardens
 Governor's Community Garden
 Knoll Gardens
 Mapperton
 Minterne Gardens
 Nothe Gardens
 Thomas Hardy's Cottage
 Victoria Gardens
 Weymouth Peace Garden

East Riding of Yorkshire
 Burnby Hall Gardens

East Sussex
 Bateman's
 Charleston Manor
 Great Dixter
 Merriments
 Sheffield Park

Essex
 Gardens in Essex
Gibberd Garden

Gloucestershire
 Barnsley House
 Batsford Arboretum
 Hidcote Manor Garden
 Kiftsgate Court Gardens
 Owlpen
 Sezincote
 Westbury Court
 Westonbirt Arboretum

Greater London

 Capel Manor College, London Borough of Enfield
 Chelsea Physic Garden
 Chiswick House
 Hall Place and Gardens, London Borough of Bexley
 Hampton Court
 The Hill Garden and Pergola, London Borough of Camden
 Holland Park, including The Kyoto Garden
 Kensington Gardens (and Hyde Park)
 Gardens of Kenwood House (on Hampstead Heath)
 Kew Gardens, also listed under Surrey below
 St James's Park

Greater Manchester
 Fletcher Moss Botanical Garden

Hampshire
 Exbury Gardens
 Furzey Gardens
 Hinton Ampner
 Longstock Park
 Mottisfont Abbey
 Sir Harold Hillier Gardens
 Staunton Country Park
 The Vyne
 West Green House

Hertfordshire
 Benington Lordship
 Gardens of the Rose
 Hatfield House

Isles of Scilly
 Carreg Dhu
 Tresco

Kent
 Bedgebury National Pinetum
 Doddington Place Gardens
 Emmetts Garden
 Goodnestone Park
 Great Comp Garden, near Borough Green
 Groombridge Place
 Hever Castle
 Hole Park
 Leeds Castle
 Marle Place
 Mount Ephraim Gardens, near Faversham
 Penshurst Place
 Pines Garden (Near St Margerets Bay)
 Scotney Castle
 Sissinghurst Garden
 Yalding Organic Gardens

Lancashire
 Avenham Park
 Bank Hall Gardens
 Gresgarth Hall
 Rufford Old Hall

Merseyside
 Hesketh Park, Southport
 Sefton Park
 Southport Botanic Gardens

Norfolk
 East Ruston Old Vicarage
 Fairhaven Gardens
 Foggy Bottom
 Mannington Gardens
 Plantation Garden

North Yorkshire
 Burnby Hall Gardens, Pocklington
 The Forbidden Corner, Middleham
 Harlow Carr Botanical Gardens, Royal Horticultural Society
 Helmsley Walled Garden
 Museum Gardens, York
 Parcevall Hall Gardens, Skipton
 Rievaulx Terrace & Temples, Helmsley - National Trust
 Thorp Perrow Arboretum

Northamptonshire
 Cottesbrook Hall

Northumberland
 Belsay Hall
 Cragside
 Wallington, Northumberland

Oxfordshire
 Blenheim Palace
 Harcourt Arboretum
 Oxford University Parks
 Rousham House
 University of Oxford Botanic Garden
 Westwell Manor

Rutland
 Barnsdale Gardens

Shropshire
 Hodnet Hall
 Wollerton Old Hall

Somerset
 Barrington Court
 Cothay Manor
 Dunster Castle
 East Lambrook Manor
 Folly Farm, Somerset
 Gauldon Manor Garden
 Hadspen House
 Hestercombe House
 Prior Park Landscape Garden
 The Walled Gardens of Cannington

South Yorkshire
 Sheffield Botanical Gardens

Staffordshire
 Biddulph Grange

Suffolk
 Helmingham Hall
 Somerleyton Hall

Surrey
 Busbridge Lakes
 Claremont
 Hatchlands
 Loseley Park
 Painshill Park
 Polesden Lacey
 Ramster
 Royal Botanic Gardens, Kew, also listed under Greater London above
 Royal Horticultural Society Garden, Wisley
 Savill Garden
 Sutton Place
 Titsey Place
 Valley Gardens
 Winkworth Arboretum

Sussex
 See East Sussex and West Sussex

West Sussex
 Borde Hill Garden
 High Beeches Gardens
 Highdown Gardens
 Leonardslee
 Nymans
 Royal Pavilion
 St. Mary's House
 Stansted Park
 Wakehurst Place

Wiltshire
 Bowood House
 The Courts Garden
 Iford Manor
 Lacock Abbey
 Stourhead

Worcestershire
 Bodenham Arboretum
 The Leasowes

Yorkshire
 See East Riding of Yorkshire, South Yorkshire and North Yorkshire

Isle of Wight
 Ventnor Botanic Garden

See also
 English garden
 List of gardens
 List of botanical gardens
 Gardens in Scotland
 Gardens in Wales
 Gardens in Northern Ireland

References

External links
 Great British Gardens

 
England
England-related lists